Hard Drinkin' Lincoln is a Macromedia Flash Internet cartoon series produced in 2000 for the Internet animation company Icebox.com. The series was created by Mike Reiss and directed by Xeth Feinberg. Unlike Reiss and Feinberg's later series for Icebox, Queer Duck, Hard Drinkin' Lincoln did not receive attention from other media outlets, but still received some coverage.

Synopsis
The series portrays Abraham Lincoln (voiced by Jim Ward) as a boorish alcoholic who enjoys pestering his wife Mary Todd Lincoln (voiced by Jocelyn Blue, later Tress MacNeille) and causing trouble during shows at Ford's Theatre. Many episodes end with Hard Drinkin' Lincoln being shot by John Wilkes Booth (the main antagonist, voiced by Maurice LaMarche), often to the delight of bystanders. Other historical figures who appear in the episodes include Jenny Lind, Mohandas Gandhi, Ulysses S. Grant, Robert E. Lee and Frederick Douglass. Creator Reiss explained: "What makes me proud of 'Hard Drinkin' Lincoln' is that it's a totally undeserved attack. The comedy comes from the fact that this man did nothing to deserve this."

Credits
Written & Created by: Mike Reiss
Directed & Produced by: Xeth Feinberg
Voices: Jim Ward, Jocelyn Blue, Maurice LaMarche, Kath Soucie, Kevin Michael Richardson, Tress MacNeille
Animation Director & Designer: Xeth Feinberg
Music by: Xeth Feinberg and Sam Elwitt
Theme Music by: Sam Elwitt
Executive Producer: Mike Reiss

Reception
Richard von Busack of MetroActive said that the series had witty "moments of humor" and praised the cartoons on Icebox.com, adding that he never heard the theme song of the series "without a surge of patriotism," adding that the animated series is "a reminder of the sacredness of the First Amendment." Joshua Shenk of The American Prospect described the show as a "typical Lincoln image" and said that Lincoln, in the show, "is a blend of Homer Simpson and Kenny from South Park." Academic Barry Schwartz described the show as one of the recent Lincoln spoofs which are "cut from the same cloth as ongoing museum controversies involving "transgressive" art." Wired described the series as "improbable" and one of the company's entrances into a "crowded world of online animation entertainment sites" and the Baltimore Sun said that critics and visitors have "raved over" the show. Scott Bass of Streaming Media described the comedy of Mr. Wong and Hard Drinkin' Lincoln as "so edgy" that he could not "imagine seeing it on TV."

References

External links
 

American flash animated web series
American adult animated web series
Animation based on real people
Cultural depictions of Abraham Lincoln
Cultural depictions of John Wilkes Booth
Cultural depictions of Robert E. Lee
Cultural depictions of Mahatma Gandhi
Cultural depictions of Ulysses S. Grant
Cultural depictions of Jenny Lind
Cultural depictions of Frederick Douglass